Nikos Kechagias (born 21 April 1969) is a Greek professional football manager and former player.

Kechagias played as a centre back and spent the majority of his playing career with Skoda Xanthi, whom he currently is the record holder for appearances with 327 games. He was part of the Greece U23 team that won the gold medal for the 1991 Mediterranean Games in Athens.

Coaching career
After retiring as a player in 2005, Kechagias became the assistant coach of Skoda Xanthi. On 26 February 2007, he became first-team manager. He was replaced by Emilio Ferrera, but on 22 October 2007 he was brought back to the bench and completed the season in the 8th place. Since then, he has worked occasionally in teams of lower leagues such as Panetolikos, Thrasyvoulos Fylis and Anagennisi Karditsas. On 31 January 2012 he signed a new contract with AEL, the last team of his club career, till the end of the season, but after only 6 games in the club's bench he was replaced by Michalis Ziogas.

References

External links
 Career
 Career
 Appearances Recordman
 Thrasyvoulos
 AEL 1964
 AEL 1964

1969 births
Living people
Footballers from Volos
Greek footballers
Xanthi F.C. players
Athlitiki Enosi Larissa F.C. players
Association football defenders
Mediterranean Games gold medalists for Greece
Mediterranean Games medalists in football
Competitors at the 1991 Mediterranean Games
Greek football managers
Xanthi F.C. managers
Panetolikos F.C. managers
Thrasyvoulos F.C. managers
Anagennisi Karditsa F.C. managers
Athlitiki Enosi Larissa F.C. managers